Timothy McIntosh Jr. is an American professional barber, businessman and philanthropist. He is the founder of Park West Barber School.

Professional career
McIntosh was born in Forestville, Maryland and went to the Prince George's County Public Schools system. He attended North Carolina Central University in Durham, North Carolina, where he received a bachelor's degree in Business Administration.

As a professional Barber McIntsosh has owned and operated hair salons and barber shops.  He is presently Managing Partner of Park West Barber School, which has eight locations across four states. McIntosh also has served on the North Carolina State Board of Barber Examiners, the Clinton School Center on Community Philanthropy at the University of Arkansas, and the Board of Visitors for North Carolina Central University's School of Business.

McIntosh was a founding member of The Next Generation of African American Philanthropists. He has been recognized for his business work and philanthropy with the 2011 Greater Durham Chamber of Commerce Business Excellence Award and the 2011 Ambassador James A. Joseph Emerging Leader in Philanthropy Award.

McIntosh has a wife, Charrisse, and two children. They live in Durham.

References 

American hairdressers
Living people
Year of birth missing (living people)